Chanda Dancy (born Chanda Yvette Dancy; November 14, 1978) is an American film composer, violinist, keyboardist, and singer.

Founder and President of CYD Music, Dancy is an artist and composer for film and other multimedia. She is also member of the rock band, Modern Time Machines. A fellow of the 2009 Sundance Film Composers Lab, a winner of the 2002 BMI Pete Carpenter Fellowship for Aspiring Film Composers and the 2004 APM/YMF Music Business Award where she was honored alongside great film composer, John Williams, Chanda has had the opportunity to score several films including the official Sundance Film Festival selection MVP, the critically acclaimed documentary and official selection of the Vienna International Film Festival, What Are We Waiting For?, and the award winning feature Chandler Hall. Music by Chanda has been heard all over the world in such festivals as Cannes Film Festival, Jackson Hole Film Festival, Sapporo Short Film Festival, Slamdance, Sundance and Pangea Day 2008. In addition to her film scores, Chanda has composed the music for the acclaimed role playing games Arabian Lords and Tariq's Treasures by BreakAway Games, as well as the sound implementation for the PC role playing game Never Winter Nights 2 by Obsidian Entertainment and Atari.

References

External links

Chanda Dancy at Rotten Tomatoes
Chanda Dancy - Composer

1978 births
20th-century African-American women singers
21st-century African-American musicians
21st-century African-American women
21st-century American composers
21st-century American women musicians
21st-century classical composers
21st-century classical violinists
21st-century women composers
African-American classical composers
American classical composers
African-American film score composers
African-American women classical composers
American classical musicians
American classical violinists
American film score composers
American keyboardists
American women classical composers
American women film score composers
Classical musicians from California
Classical musicians from Ohio
Houston Christian University alumni
Living people
Musicians from Cleveland
Musicians from Los Angeles
USC Thornton School of Music alumni
Women in classical music
21st-century American violinists